Pseudosquillopsis is a genus of mantis shrimp in the family Parasquillidae.

Species
Species in the genus include:
 Pseudosquillopsis cerisii (Roux, 1828)
 Pseudosquillopsis dofleini (Balss, 1910)
 Pseudosquillopsis lessonii (Guérin, 1830)
 Pseudosquillopsis marmorata (Lockington, 1877)

References

Stomatopoda